Edadil Kadın (1845 - 12 December 1875; meaning "The elegance of the heart") was a consort of Sultan Abdulaziz of the Ottoman Empire.

Life
She was Abkhazian and was the daughter of Prince Aredba Tandal Bey. She had at least a brother. She entered palace service at a young age, where she was especially liked by Pertevniyal Sultan, Abdülaziz's mother and Valide Sultan. Edadil Kadın was presented to Abdulaziz after his accession to the throne by his half-sister, Adile Sultan, as a token of reconciliation between brother and sister. She was descrived as beautiful, with brown hair and light blue eyes.

She married Abdulaziz in 1861 in the Dolmabahçe Palace, after his accession to the throne, and was given the title of "Second Kadın". A year after the marriage, on 14 November 1862, she gave birth to her first child, a son, Şehzade Mahmud Celaleddin. 

Four years later, on 30 November 1866, she gave birth to her second child, a daughter, Emine Sultan, who died on 23 January 1867.

Death
Edadil died on 12 December 1875 in the Dolmabahçe Palace, a year before her Abdulaziz's death, because sadness for her brither's premature death, and was buried in the mausoleum of Sultan Mahmud II, located at Divan Yolu street.

Issue

See also
Kadın (title)
Ottoman Imperial Harem
List of consorts of the Ottoman sultans

References

Sources

 

 

1875 deaths
19th-century consorts of Ottoman sultans